Martin Järveoja (born 18 August 1987) is an Estonian rally co-driver. He is currently teamed with Ott Tänak and is competing for M-Sport in the World Rally Championship.

Rally career
He is the son of Estonian politician Toomas Järveoja, and originally a Judo competitor (he was five-time champion in Estonia). Järveoja began his rally career in 2006, co-driving for several drivers, including his cousin Ken Järveoja and uncle Tarmo Järveoja, competing in the regional and national championships.

In 2010, Järveoja made his debut in the World Rally Championship, co-driving for Karl Kruuda in Jordan. The pair finished fifth in the 2014 World Rally Championship-2 after wins in Finland and Sweden. 

In December 2016, Järveoja signed a contract with M-Sport World Rally Team and formed a partnership with Ott Tänak. He and Tänak claimed their first World Rally Championship victory in the 2017 Rally Italia Sardegna.

From 2018, Järveoja and Tänak compete for Toyota Gazoo Racing WRT. In 2019, they won in Sweden, Chile, Portugal, Finland, Germany and Wales. They were crowned the world champions in Catalunya, with one race to spare.

Victories

WRC victories

Results

WRC results

* Season still in progress.

WRC-2 results

JWRC results

SWRC results

References

External links

Martin Järveoja on Instagram
Profile on WRC.com
Profile on eWRC-results.com

1987 births
Living people
Estonian rally co-drivers
World Rally Championship co-drivers
Estonian male judoka
People from Elva, Estonia